The Castiglioni were a prominent family from the Lombard aristocracy since the 10th Century. Several buildings that were the property of this family are named Palazzo Castiglioni, including:

 Palazzo Castiglioni (Milan)
 Palazzo Castiglioni (Cingoli), Marche
 Palazzo Bonacolsi (formerly Palazzo Castiglioni), Mantua